Rexford George Holman (born 1935) is an American film and television actor.

Holman was born in Oklahoma. He began his screen career in 1959, appearing in the anthology television series The Millionaire. In 1960 he made his film debut in Ma Barker's Killer Brood. Holman made several appearances in the western television series Gunsmoke, his first appearance being in the episode "Small Water".

Holman guest-starred in television programs including Bonanza, Tales of Wells Fargo, Rawhide, The Virginian, Mission: Impossible, Mannix, The Twilight Zone, Land of the Giants, The Big Valley, Have Gun Will Travel, as Blake,EpisodeTwo Plus One'xThe Deputy, The Fall Guy, The Streets of San Francisco, Wagon Train,The Rifleman, Death Valley Days, Daniel Boone, Lawman  and Star Trek. He also played the recurring role of India in the western television series The Road West. His final television credit was from the television series Wildside in 1985.

Holman's film appearances included The Hindenburg, Young Jesse James, The Quick Gun, The Outlaws Is Coming, The Oscar, The Wrecking Crew, When the North Wind Blows, The Cool Ones, Joy in the Morning, Your Cheatin' Heart and Escape to Witch Mountain. His final film credit was in the 1989 film Star Trek V: The Final Frontier''.

References

External links 

 
 
 
 Rotten Tomatoes profile

1935 births
Living people
Male actors from Oklahoma
American male film actors
American male television actors
20th-century American male actors
Western (genre) television actors